Doğancık can refer to:

 Doğancık, Baskil
 Doğancık, Sultandağı